"Non possumus" is a Latin, Catholic, religious phrase that translates as "we cannot". It originated with the martyrdom of the Martyrs of Abitinae, who were murdered in AD 304 when Roman Emperor Diocletian prohibited Christians under penalty of death to possess the Sacred Scriptures, convene on Sunday to celebrate the Holy Eucharist, and erect premises for their assemblies.

The phrase was not intended to express incapacity but, on the contrary, absolute moral determination to obey the Catholic Faith.

The full sentence of the phrase is "sine dominico non possumus" ("we cannot [live] without Sunday"). It expresses the necessity of Sunday and the Holy Eucharist for Christianity.

Another ecclesiastic use of the phrase has been attributed to Pope Leo the Great, who wrote in AD 448 that "quibus viventibus non communicavimus mortuis communicare non possumus" ("we cannot hold communion in death with those who in life were not in communion with us"). Recourse to this principle has been had to justify various ecclesiastical practices, including refusal of funeral liturgies and refusal of abrogating the  ex-communication of decedents. Some have used it to object to ecumenism and general relations with non-Christians.

In the 19th and 20th centuries, "non possumus" dominated the diplomacy of Popes Pius IX, Leo XIII, St.  Pius X, Benedict XV, and Pius XI, especially after the capture of Rome when the Supreme Pontiff became the prisoner in the Vatican and chose to limit his contact with the outside world. It is generally thought that the Second Vatican Council reversed this attitude.

This Latin phrase is also connected with the history of Poland. On 8 May 1953 Polish bishops sent a formal letter to the party leaders of the communist People's Republic of Poland to declare their decisive refusal to subordinate the Church to the communist state. In retaliation, the government imprisoned their Primate, Cardinal Stefan Wyszyński.

References

Latin religious words and phrases